The Miami Valley Open was a golf tournament on the Nike Tour. It ran from 1993 to 1998. It was played at Heatherwoode Golf Course in Springboro, Ohio.

In 1995 the winner earned $40,500.

Winners

Former Korn Ferry Tour events
Golf in Ohio
Recurring sporting events established in 1993
Recurring sporting events disestablished in 1998
1993 establishments in Ohio
1998 disestablishments in Ohio